The following is a list of songs recorded by the American punk rock band Green Day. Since their first single in 1989, the band has gone on to release over 200 songs. This list includes songs from studio albums, compilation albums and singles, along with covers and known unreleased tracks. Songs recorded by any of the band's side projects are not included.

List
Members of Green Day are Billie Joe Armstrong, Mike Dirnt, and Tré Cool, except where noted.

Unreleased Songs

Notes

References

Green Day